Bogen is a small village in Bindal Municipality in Nordland county, Norway.  It is located on the eastern shore of the island of Austra.  It sits at the southern end of the Valen fjord arm, just across a narrow channel from the hamlet of Valen on the mainland.

References

Bindal
Villages in Nordland